10,000 Light Years Ago is the second solo album by John Lodge of The Moody Blues, released in May 2015.

After 38 years from his previous solo work Natural Avenue (1977), the bassist and vocalist of the Moody Blues released 10,000 Light Years Ago. The disk includes founding members of the Moody Blues Mike Pinder and Ray Thomas in the song "Simply Magic" and guitarist Chris Spedding elsewhere on the album, who also appeared on Lodge's previous album.

Track listing

Personnel

John Lodge – bass, guitar, vocals
Chris Spedding – guitar
Mike Pinder – mellotron on "Simply Magic"
Ray Thomas – flute on "Simply Magic"
Alan Hewitt – keyboards, vocals
Brian Howe – vocals
Brian Price – guitar
Gordon Marshall – drums, percussion
John Defaria – guitar
Norda Mullen – flute
Mike Piggott – violin

References

2015 albums
John Lodge (musician) albums